The 82nd Texas Legislature began on January 11, 2011 and ended on May 29, 2011. All members of the House and 16 of the 31 members of the Senate were elected in the general election held on November 2, 2010.

Party summary

Senate

House of Representatives

Officers

Senate
 Lieutenant Governor: David Dewhurst (R)
 President Pro Tempore: Steve Ogden (R)

House of Representatives
 Speaker of the House: Joe Straus (R)
 Speaker Pro Tempore: Beverly Woolley (R)

Members

Senate

House of Representatives

Legislation
The 82nd Legislature's passing of HB-351 and SB-462 reformed Texas' expungement code to include relief for those convicted but later determined to be innocent.

References

External links 

82 Texas Legislature
2011 in Texas
2011 U.S. legislative sessions